is a Japanese former professional baseball pitcher for the Hanshin Tigers in Japan's Nippon Professional Baseball. He played from 2004 to 2005 and from 2007 to 2016.

External links

NPB stats

1981 births
Living people
People from Iyo, Ehime
Baseball people from Ehime Prefecture
Japanese expatriate baseball players in the United States
Waikiki Beach Boys players
Nippon Professional Baseball pitchers
Hanshin Tigers players